Birreencorragh is a mountain in the Nephin Beg Range, County Mayo, Ireland, reaching  above sea level.

Etymology 
The name Birreencorragh derives from the Irish , meaning "rocky little spike";  is found in very few Irish toponyms.

Geography 
The mountain is separated from nearby mountains, such as Glennamong and Nephin Beg in the west and Nephin in the east, by deep depressions. It makes a good viewpoint of the Nephin Beg Range.

References

See also
List of mountains in Ireland

Mountains and hills of County Mayo
Marilyns of Ireland
Hewitts of Ireland
Mountains under 1000 metres